Filippo Casoni (1599–1659) was a Roman Catholic prelate who served as Bishop of Borgo San Donnino (1651–1659).

Biography
Filippo Casoni was born in 1599 in Sarzana, Italy.
On 27 Feb 1651, he was appointed during the papacy of Pope Innocent X as Bishop of Borgo San Donnino.
On 12 Mar 1651, he was consecrated bishop by Giulio Roma, Cardinal-Bishop of Porto e Santa Rufina, with Ranuccio Scotti Douglas, Bishop Emeritus of Borgo San Donnino, and Francesco Biglia, Bishop of Pavia, serving as co-consecrators. 
He served as Bishop of Borgo San Donnino until his death on 22 Jul 1659.

While bishop, he was the principal co-consecrator of Rinaldo d'Este, Bishop of Reggio Emilia (1651); and Antonio Bichi, Bishop of Montalcino (1652).

References

External links and additional sources
 (for Chronology of Bishops) 
 (for Chronology of Bishops) 

17th-century Italian Roman Catholic bishops
Bishops appointed by Pope Innocent X
1599 births
1659 deaths